Lob may refer to:

Sports
 Lob (pickleball)
 Lob (tennis)
 Lob (association football), a lofted pass or shot in association football
 Lob bowling, an archaic bowling style in cricket

People
 Lob Brown, American college football player
 Löb Nevakhovich (between 1776 and 1778–1831), Russian writer
 Löb Strauß, birth name of Levi Strauss (1829–1902), German-born American businessman
 Eliezer Löb (1837–1892), German rabbi
 Jacques Lob (1932–1990), French comic book creator
 Leopold Löb, birth name of Leopold Einstein (1833–1890), German esperantist
 Martin Löb (1921–2006), German mathematician

Other uses
 Lob (haircut)
 Lob bomb, a rocket-fired improvised explosive device
 Lobi language (ISO 639-3: lob), a Gur language of western Africa
 Lob, in folklore, a type of brownie
 Lob, a poem by Edward Thomas

See also
 LOB (disambiguation)
 Löb (disambiguation)
 Lobb (disambiguation)
 Lobe (disambiguation)
 Laub (disambiguation)